In linear algebra, a convergent matrix is a matrix that converges to the zero matrix under matrix exponentiation.

Background
When successive powers of a matrix T become small (that is, when all of the entries of T approach zero, upon raising T to successive powers), the matrix T converges to the zero matrix.  A regular splitting of a non-singular matrix A results in a convergent matrix T.  A semi-convergent splitting of a matrix A results in a semi-convergent matrix T.  A general iterative method converges for every initial vector if T is convergent, and under certain conditions if T is semi-convergent.

Definition
We call an n × n matrix T a convergent matrix if

for each i = 1, 2, ..., n and j = 1, 2, ..., n.

Example
Let

Computing successive powers of T, we obtain

and, in general,

Since

and

T is a convergent matrix.  Note that ρ(T) = , where ρ(T) represents the spectral radius of T, since  is the only eigenvalue of T.

Characterizations
Let T be an n × n matrix.  The following properties are equivalent to T being a convergent matrix:
 for some natural norm;
 for all natural norms;
;
 for every x.

Iterative methods

A general iterative method involves a process that converts the system of linear equations

into an equivalent system of the form

for some matrix T and vector c.  After the initial vector x(0) is selected, the sequence of approximate solution vectors is generated by computing

for each k ≥ 0.

Regular splitting

A  matrix splitting is an expression which represents a given matrix as a sum or difference of matrices.  In the system of linear equations above, with A non-singular, the matrix A can be split, that is, written as a difference

The expression is a regular splitting of A if and only if B−1 ≥ 0 and C ≥ 0, that is,  and C have only nonnegative entries. If the splitting is a regular splitting of the matrix A and A−1 ≥ 0, then ρ(T) < 1 and T is a convergent matrix. Hence the method converges.

Semi-convergent matrix
We call an n × n matrix T a semi-convergent matrix if the limit

exists. In this case, the splitting is called a semi-convergent splitting of A.

See also
Gauss–Seidel method
Jacobi method
List of matrices
Nilpotent matrix
Successive over-relaxation

Notes

References
 .
 .
 
 
 .

Limits (mathematics)
Matrices
Numerical linear algebra
Relaxation (iterative methods)